"The Power of One" is a 2000 song composed by Mervyn Warren and Mark Chait. It was performed by Donna Summer and is the theme song for the movie Pokémon: The Movie 2000. Pokémon: The Movie 2000, subtitled The Power of One, was released in late 1999 and was the second feature-length film based on the Japanese Pokémon video game series. It was also heard in the trailers for all three of the Kids' WB-released films.

The song was released on July 11, 2000  by Atlantic Records and Warner Bros. Records as the first single from Pokémon 2000 soundtrack album. It was produced by renowned music producer David Foster. Summer and Foster had previously collaborated in 1996 on the song "Whenever There Is Love," the theme to the Sylvester Stallone film Daylight.

"The Power of One" was included as track 1 on the soundtrack album and was released as two different CD singles in the United States. A number of dance remixes by Jonathan Peters and Tommy Musto were also issued on vinyl to nightclub DJs. Following 1999's "I Will Go with You (Con te partirò)" and "Love Is the Healer" which both topped the US Hot Dance Club Play chart that year, the club remix of "The Power of One" became another dancefloor success for Summer, peaking at #2 on the same chart in 2000. The 4-track remix CD was released on October 31 in the same year.

Track listings

US CD single

Donna Summer: "The Power Of One" (Album Version) - 3:50
Ralph Schuckett: "The Legend Comes To Life" (from "The Power Of One" score) - 4:15

US CD-Maxi single

"The Power of One" (Jonathan Peters' Club Mix) - 8:19
"The Power of One" (Tommy Musto Vocal Mix) - 8:15
"The Power of One" (Jonathan Peters' Sound Factory Club Mix) - 9:22
"The Power of One" (Tommy Musto Gel Dub) - 6:26

US 12" single

Side A:
"The Power of One" (Jonathan Peters' Club Mix) - 8:16
"The Power of One" (Jonathan Peters Radio Mix) - 3:21
Side B:
"The Power of One" (Tommy Musto Vocal Mix) - 8:12
"The Power of One" (Musto Beats) - 2:44

US 2x12" promo single

A1. "The Power of One" (Jonathan Peters Club Mix) - 8:16
A2. "The Power of One" (Tommy Musto Vocal Mix) - 8:12
B1. "The Power of One" (Jonathan Peters Sound Factory Mix) - 9:22
B2. "The Power of One" (Tommy Musto Gel Dub) - 6:24
C1. "The Power of One" (Jonathan Peters Sound Factory Dub) - 10:20
C2. "The Power of One" (Jonathan Peters Drum-A-Pella) - 9:22
D1. "The Power of One" (Jonathan Peters Bonus Beats) - 8:57
D2. "The Power of One" (Tommy Musto Beats) - 2:44

Charts

Legacy
Herman Cain, a former Republican candidate for President of the United States, quoted lines from the Donna Summer song multiple times throughout his campaign. He first used them in his official campaign announcement, mis-attributing them to the closing song of the 2000 Olympics. He made the same mistake at the Republican Leadership Conference in New Orleans on June 17, 2011. During an August debate, Cain again quoted the lyrics, this time attributing them to a poet. In a December interview with GQ, Cain acknowledged that the song came from a Pokémon film, but reiterated that he heard it during the close of the 2000 Olympics and stated that he had not previously known that it had originated in this film. However, "The Power of One" was not played during the Olympics' closing ceremony.

During Cain's announcement that he would be suspending his presidential campaign, he again quoted these lyrics, acknowledging that they came from a Pokémon movie.

References

2000s ballads
Donna Summer songs
2000 songs
2000 singles
Songs from Pokémon
Songs written by Mervyn Warren
Song recordings produced by David Foster
Pop ballads
Contemporary R&B ballads
Gospel songs
Soul ballads
Atlantic Records singles
Warner Records singles
Songs written for films